Chryseobacterium reticulitermitis  is a Gram-negative, aerobic rod-shaped and non-motile bacteria from the genus of Chryseobacterium which has been isolated from the gut of the termite Reticulitermes aculabialis.

References

External links
Type strain of Chryseobacterium reticulitermitis at BacDive -  the Bacterial Diversity Metadatabase

reticulitermitis
Bacteria described in 2017